Sarpaniran Rural District is a rural district (dehestan) in the Central District of Pasargad County, Fars Province, Iran. At the 2006 census, its population was 2,185, in 558 families.  The rural district has 16 villages.

References 

Rural Districts of Fars Province
Pasargad County